Fun in the Streets is a 1969 Danish comedy film directed by Carl Ottosen and starring Dirch Passer.

Cast
 Dirch Passer - Peter Jensen
 Winnie Mortensen - Winnie
 Ove Sprogøe - Fløjten
 Willy Rathnov - Rasmussen
 Karl Stegger - Bagermester Jacobsen
 Carl Ottosen - Chefen
 Lotte Horne - Elisabeth
 Birgit Sadolin - Faster Anna
 Arne Møller - Carlo
 Kurt Andersen - Orla
 Ernst Meyer - Gossain
 Poul Bundgaard - Fordrukken mand i opgang
 Bodil Udsen - Hans sure kone
 Inger Gleerup - Ekspeditrice i stormagasin
 Poul Glargaard - Kriminalassistent
 Marianne Tholsted - Ekspeditrice i legetøjsforretning
 Claus Ryskjær - Cykelbud
 Palle Justesen - Hotelportier

External links

1969 films
1960s Danish-language films
1969 comedy films
Films directed by Carl Ottosen
Films scored by Sven Gyldmark
Danish comedy films